Dutlwe is a village in Kweneng District of Botswana. The population of Dutlwe was 1,055 in 2011 census.

References

Kweneng District
Villages in Botswana